Jean-Louis Dubut de Laforest (24 July 1853 – 3 April 1902) was a French author. He was a prolific writer, and published many novels on topics that were considered daring for the times, some of which were serialized in the press.

Life

Jean-Louis Dubut de Laforest was born in Saint-Pardoux-la-Rivière, Dordogne on 24 July 1853.
He attended secondary schools in Périgueux and Limoges. 
After studying law, Jean-Louis Laforest Dubut became an advocate and editor of the newspaper L'Avenir de la Dordogne. 
He was appointed prefectorial counselor in Beauvais, Oise, in 1879, but resigned in 1882 and devoted himself to literature. 
He wrote many novels and plays, and contributed to Le Figaro under the pseudonym "Jean Tolbiac".

Dubut de Laforest was a member of Le Chat Noir and of the theatrical and artistic circle Gardénia, founded by Paul Fabre.
He published a number of novels that were based on the scientific discoveries of his time, and also novels of manners: Les Dames de Lameth, Tête à l'envers, La Crucifiée, Le Rêve d'un viveur, Un américain de Paris, Belle-maman, La Baronne Emma, Contes à la paresseuse, Les Dévorants de Paris, Le Gaga, La Bonne à tout-faire, Le Cornac, Mademoiselle de Marbeuf and Contes à la lune.

In Le Faiseur d'hommes (The Maker of Men) (1884), Dubut de Laforest treated the problem of artificial insemination of a woman for the first time in the history of literature.
He addressed realities such as the existence of homosexual circles in Paris in La Vierge du trottoir and Esthètes et cambrioleurs.
He broke literary taboos. When he published Le Gaga in 1885 he was prosecuted for obscenity before the court of Assizes. 
The author was sentenced to a fine of 1,000 francs and two months in prison. 
Collected in the thirty-seven volume series Derniers Scandales de Paris (1898–1900), his novels of manners depicted a whole parallel world of prostitutes, pimps and bad boys.
He was called "an anticlerical and obscene novelist" by a conservative critic.
He shared with other authors the distinction of being placed in the "inferno" of the National Library.

Despite his success, Dubut de Laforest committed suicide on 3 April 1902.

Works

Les Derniers Scandales de Paris, 37 volumes, éditions Fayard, 1898–1900, included the following titles:

 La Vierge du trottoir
Les Souteneurs en habit noir 
 La Grande Horizontale
Le Dernier Gigolo
 Madame Don Juan
 Le Caissier du tripot
 Le Docteur Mort-aux-gosses
 Le Tartuffe-Paillard
 Les Victimes de la débauche
 Ces Dames au salon et à la mer
Les Écuries d'Augias
 Agathe-la-Goule
 Esthètes et cambrioleurs
Un Bandit amoureux
 La Brocante
 Per' Mich Maîtresses et amants
 Faiseurs et gogos
 Haute galanterie
Le Lanceur de femmes
 Les Petites Rastas
 Farabinas
 La Demoiselle de magasin
 Robes et manteaux
 Peau-de-balle et balais-de-crin
 Le Coiffeur pour dames
 Travail et volupté
 Le Nouveau Commis voyageur
 L'Homme de joie
 La Marmite d'or
 Mademoiselle de Marbeuf
 Morphine: describes the downfall of a man who is addicted to drugs
 Cloé de Haut-Brion
 La Môme réséda
 La Bombe
 Rédemption

ReferencesCitationsSources'''

Further reading

 Edmond Hippeau, L'affaire du « Gaga », Paris, E. Dentu, 1886.
 Charles Grivel, « Pathologie sociale et tératologie littéraire. Dubut de Laforest », in Relecture des « petits » naturalistes, actes du colloque, 9, 10, 11 December 1999, RITM, hors-série, Université Paris-X, 2000, p. 303-324.
 Arnould de Liedekerke, La Belle Époque de l'opium, Paris, Éditions de la Différence, 1984, p.|107-109 and 220-222.
 Jean de Palacio, « De la nymphomanie dans quelques romans fin-de-siècle », Le Roman libertin et le roman érotique, actes du colloque de Chaudfontaine, 9, 10, 11 November 2002, Les Cahiers des paralittératures 9, Liège, Édition du Céfal, 2005, p. 157-167; reprinted in Configurations décadentes'', Louvain, Peeters, 2007, p. 203-214.

External links

 
 
 

1853 births
1902 deaths

19th-century French male writers
1902 suicides
Suicides in France